Manchester is a small incorporated town in northeastern Carroll County, Maryland, United States, located just south of the Pennsylvania state line and north of Baltimore. The population was 4,808 at the 2010 census.

Manchester was incorporated in 1833 and is the second oldest incorporated area in Carroll County after Westminster, which was incorporated in 1818. The town was originally formed as a part of Baltimore County, before the creation of Carroll County in 1837. It is governed by an elected mayor and an elected five-person town council.

Manchester lies in the humid continental climate region, marked by cold and snowy winters but humid and hot summers. This climate is ideal for growing farmed crops in the summer such as tomatoes, sweet corn and squash, leaving much of the outlying area marked with large tracts of farmland. Manchester is a rural commuting town where residents travel to work in the greater Baltimore Metropolitan Area and the greater Washington Metropolitan Area.

History

The Town of Manchester, officially incorporated in 1833, was originally known as "Manchester Germantown". However, the name Germantown referred to a community west of Manchester that was later incorporated with the town. The town was originally laid out in Baltimore County and remained a part of that county until the creation of Carroll County on January 19, 1837.

Prior to European colonization, the Susquehannock people occupied the territory now within the borders of Manchester. At the center of town stands an intersection of what were once two important Native American trails. One part of the trail connected the Potomac and Susquehanna rivers, and the other ran from the Conewago River to the Patapsco River (Hanover, Pennsylvania to Baltimore, Maryland). The latter trail was laid out in 1737 as the first public road in what is now Carroll County by Robert Owings.

The first land grant in the area, a tract of  known as "Steven's Hope", was given to Samuel Stevens, and was laid at the intersection of present-day Lineboro Road. The first European settlers were English but later immigration brought people of German descent. There were many early land grants; the first one touching the present confines of town was made in 1758, issued to "German Churche". Richards laid out the town of Manchester, naming it after his home town in England.

From the 18th century until the earliest parts of the 20th century, the primary languages spoken by the residents was German, or Pennsylvania Dutch. The custom of the German residents of making noodles and stringing them on lines outside their homes would give the town the nickname "Noodle Doosey". Later, Manchester would receive another nickname when the German custom of making ginger cakes brought on "Gingercake Town". Manchester was also a relatively large cigar manufacturing town, from after the Civil War until around 1930, when the mass production of cigars made the manual method in use in the town less economical.

Manchester was the home of one of the first colleges in Carroll County when, in 1858, Irving College, named after poet Washington Irving, was established by Dr. Ferdinand Dieffenbach. During the Civil War the success of the school was greatly hampered by the death of Dr. Dieffenbach and the low number of young men returning from the front lines. The school changed its name to Irving Institute in 1886 and finally ceased operation by 1893.

During the American Civil War, Manchester was used as a camping area for the Union Sixth Army Corps under General John Sedgwick on July 1, 1863. The next day, the army made its march to the Battle of Gettysburg.

Manchester has had three newspapers. The first, called the Manchester Gazette, began publishing weekly in 1870 and ceased in 1872. The second went into print on December 11, 1880, and was called the Manchester Enterprise, and in 1888 the Telephone Messenger was established.

The official seal of the town of Manchester is a church steeple in the foreground and the likeness of a leaf-less tree in the background with the text "Founded 1765 Incorporated 1834".

The image of the tree is a representation of a White Oak and is considered the town symbol. The "Lutheran White Oak", as it has come to be known, is estimated at 320 years old. The large oak became a fixture of the town when, in 1758, King George III granted a charter to German colonists to erect a church near the tree. The town newsletter was named Oaknotes as an homage to the large White Oak tree.

Manchester is a typical "Main Street" town that continues expanding to accommodate a growing population.  Manchester has its own post office, and home mail delivery is available to most residents. A majority, an estimated 95%, of town residents commute to work. There are no large employers inside the town limits, but there are many small businesses. Manchester is mostly residential buildings, with some restaurants, a bank and other small retail storefronts. A large portion of the businesses are located on or around Main Street which Maryland Route 30 becomes once entering "downtown" Manchester.

Demographics

The median income for a household in the town was $57,390, and the median income for a family was $62,679. Males had a median income of $37,794 versus $29,118 for females. The per capita income for the town was $20,956. About 0.9% of families and 2.1% of the population were below the poverty line, including 2.1% of those under age 18 and 4.7% of those age 65 or over.

2010 census
As of the census of 2010, there were 4,808 people, 1,632 households, and 1,269 families residing in the town. The racial makeup of the town was 92.0% White, 3.3% African American, 1.6% Asian, 0.1% Pacific Islander, 1.6% from other races, and 1.5% from two or more races. Hispanic or Latino of any race were 3.5% of the population.

There were 1,632 households, of which 44.1% had children under the age of 18 living with them, 64.2% were married couples living together, 8.8% had a female householder with no husband present, 4.8% had a male householder with no wife present, and 22.2% were non-families. 18.3% of all households were made up of individuals, and 7.2% had someone living alone who was 65 years of age or older. The average household size was 2.88 and the average family size was 3.26.

The median age in the town was 37.3 years. 27.5% of residents were under the age of 18; 7.7% were between the ages of 18 and 24; 27.6% were from 25 to 44; 26.7% were from 45 to 64; and 10.3% were 65 years of age or older. The gender makeup of the town was 48.8% male and 51.2% female.

Geography

Topography
Manchester is located at  (39.661762, -76.888014).

Manchester is located on the Piedmont Plateau, west of the coastal lowlands of the Chesapeake Bay, in an area of rolling upland.  Manchester's environs are the highest point in the state of Maryland east of the Appalachian Mountains.

Climate
Manchester lies in the transition zone between the humid subtropical and humid continental climate zones, and experiences higher annual snowfall and colder temperatures than the southern half of Maryland, which lies in the humid subtropical climate zone.

The hottest summer month is July, during which temperatures average a high of 87 °F (31 °C) with an average low of 63 °F (17 °C). The coldest month is January with an average high of 38 °F (3 °C) and average low of 21 °F (-6 °C) Manchester receives an annual precipitation of 43.67 inches (110.9 cm).

Events
During the summer, Manchester hosts the Manchester Volunteer Fire Department Carnival. The carnival lasts several nights and usually coincides with Independence Day. A fireworks display is set off to celebrate the holiday.

Once a year, a female member of the Manchester community is chosen as "Miss Manchester Fire Queen".

Parks

Manchester has three major parks, totaling  of developed and undeveloped land. Manchester has the most park area of any town in Carroll County.

 Christmas Tree Park is located in the northeastern part of Manchester and has the largest developed park land in the area. It is the home of several baseball diamonds, three tennis courts, multiple playgrounds for children, and picnic and grilling areas. In the less developed and wooded area there are three small to large ponds. The park is mostly populated with pine trees that resemble Christmas trees.
Opened in July 1995, it was created as an "open classroom" for nearby Manchester Elementary School. The school students voted and selected the name "Charlotte's Quest" for the classroom as a tribute to Charlotte B. Collett, the then Town Councilwoman who oversaw the project.

Government

Manchester has a democratically elected mayor and town council. The mayor and individual councilors are elected for a term of four years. In 2011 Mayor Ryan Warner was elected for the first time, previously serving as a Town Council member.

It was announced in September 2015 that a new Town Hall building would be erected several blocks from the current location on property purchased by the town on Victory St.

Members of the town council are Todd A. Benner (2013), Douglas Myers (2013), Daniel C. Riley (2013), Tammy Black (2015), and Vincent C. Pacelli.

Manchester is in Maryland District 5A and is represented in the Maryland House of Delegates by Susan Krebs (R), Haven Shoemaker (R) and April Rose (R). In the Maryland State Senate residents are represented by Justin D. Ready (R).

At the federal level Manchester is located in the 1st Congressional District of Maryland and is represented by Andy Harris (R) in the United States House of Representatives.

Education

Manchester hosts three public schools. Two of which are primary schools and the other is a secondary school.

Manchester Elementary School was originally built in 1932 as Manchester High School. The school's current population is 604 students in pre-kindergarten, kindergarten, and grades 1 through 5.

Ebb Valley Elementary School opened in August 2008 with a student population of 467. Ebb Valley is a two-story school accommodating kindergarten through fifth grade students.

Manchester Valley High School opened in August 2009 to help alleviate overpopulation at North Carroll High School in Hampstead. Teaching grades 9 through 12, its first graduation ceremony occurred on June 1, 2011. The two high schools, Manchester Valley and North Carroll, merged as one school once again after North Carroll was shut down in 2016.

Infrastructure

Transportation

Manchester has three state designated highways within the town limits.
 Maryland Route 30
 Maryland Route 27
 Maryland Route 86

Traffic congestion is high, southbound, in the morning as commuters make their way to the greater Baltimore area. Traffic is also high in the evening as commuters make their way north to Pennsylvania via Pennsylvania Route 94 and southwest to Westminster via Maryland Route 27. There are plans to introduce a Manchester bypass relocating Route 30 outside of town limits.

Utilities
In 1907, AT&T was granted rights to operate a telegraph and telephone line in Manchester, but telephone service was not utilized until 1921. Land line-based telephone service has been provided by Verizon since its creation on June 30, 2000.

Glen Rock Electric Light and Power Company first ran electric lines through town in 1922. In 1999, Maryland deregulated the electricity industry. As the result, residents of Manchester may choose from eleven electricity suppliers in the Baltimore Gas & Electric service area.

Cable television is provided to residents by Comcast inside Carroll County. Comcast began operations in the county after purchasing the now defunct Adelphia Communications Corporation on July 31, 2006.

Water is provided to town residents by the town's Public Works Department.

Media
A video depicting some of the main streets in Manchester

See also
List of incorporated places in Maryland
Lineboro, Maryland
Mason–Dixon Line
Millers, Maryland

References

External links

 Town of Manchester official website

 
German-American culture in Maryland
Pennsylvania Dutch culture in Maryland
Towns in Carroll County, Maryland
Towns in Maryland
Populated places established in 1834
1834 establishments in Maryland
Articles containing video clips